In probability theory, the probability generating function of a discrete random variable is a power series representation (the generating function) of the probability mass function of the random variable.  Probability generating functions are often employed for their succinct description of the sequence of probabilities Pr(X = i) in the probability mass function for a random variable X, and to make available the well-developed theory of power series with non-negative coefficients.

Definition

Univariate case 
If X is a discrete random variable taking values in the non-negative integers {0,1, ...}, then the probability generating function of X is defined as

where p is the probability mass function of X.  Note that the subscripted notations GX and pX are often used to emphasize that these pertain to a particular random variable X, and to its distribution. The power series converges absolutely at least for all complex numbers z with |z| ≤ 1; in many examples the radius of convergence is larger.

Multivariate case 
If  is a discrete random variable taking values in the d-dimensional non-negative integer lattice {0,1, ...}d, then the probability generating function of X is defined as

Properties

Power series

Probability generating functions obey all the rules of power series with non-negative coefficients.  In particular, G(1−) = 1, where G(1−) = limz→1G(z) from below, since the probabilities must sum to one. So the radius of convergence of any probability generating function must be at least 1, by Abel's theorem for power series with non-negative coefficients.

Probabilities and expectations

The following properties allow the derivation of various basic quantities related to X:
 The probability mass function of X is recovered by taking derivatives of G,

 It follows from Property 1 that if random variables X and Y have probability-generating functions that are equal, then .  That is, if X and Y have identical probability-generating functions, then they have identical distributions.
 The normalization of the probability density function can be expressed in terms of the generating function by

More generally, the kth factorial moment,  of X is given by

So the variance of X is given by

Finally, the kth raw moment of X is given by

Functions of independent random variables

Probability generating functions are particularly useful for dealing with functions of independent random variables. For example:

 If X1, X2, ..., XN is a sequence of independent (and not necessarily identically distributed) random variables that take on natural-number values, and

where the ai are constant natural numbers, then the probability generating function is given by

For example, if

then the probability generating function, GSN(z), is given by

It also follows that the probability generating function of the difference of two independent random variables S = X1 − X2 is

Suppose that N, the number of independent random variables in the sum above, is not a fixed natural number but is also an independent, discrete random variable taking values on the non-negative integers, with probability generating function GN.  If the X1, X2, ..., XN are independent and identically distributed with common probability generating function GX, then

This can be seen, using the law of total expectation, as follows:

This last fact is useful in the study of Galton–Watson processes and compound Poisson processes.

Suppose again  that N is also an independent, discrete random variable taking values on the non-negative integers, with probability generating function GN and probability mass function .

For identically distributed Xi this simplifies to the identity stated before. The general case is sometimes useful to obtain a decomposition of SN by means of generating functions.

Examples

 The probability generating function of an almost surely constant random variable, i.e. one with Pr(X = c) = 1, is

 The probability generating function of a binomial random variable, the number of successes in n trials, with probability p of success in each trial, is

Note that this is the n-fold product of the probability generating function of a Bernoulli random variable with parameter p.
So the probability generating function of a fair coin, is

 The probability generating function of a negative binomial random variable on {0,1,2 ...}, the number of failures until the rth success with probability of success in each trial p, is

(Convergence for ).

Note that this is the r-fold product of the probability generating function of a geometric random variable with parameter 1 − p on {0,1,2,...}.

 The probability generating function of a Poisson random variable with rate parameter λ is

Related concepts

The probability generating function is an example of a generating function of a sequence: see also formal power series. It is equivalent to, and sometimes called, the z-transform of the probability mass function.

Other generating functions of random variables include the moment-generating function, the characteristic function and the cumulant generating function. The probability generating function is also equivalent to the factorial moment generating function, which as  can also be considered for continuous and other random variables.

Notes

References

Johnson, N.L.; Kotz, S.; Kemp, A.W. (1993) Univariate Discrete distributions (2nd edition). Wiley.  (Section 1.B9)

Functions related to probability distributions
Generating functions